Heinrich Kruse (1815-1902) was a German dramatist and publicist.

Biography
He was born at Stralsund, and studied philology at the universities of Bonn and Berlin. In 1847 he took up journalism, and in 1855 he became chief editor of the Kölnische Zeitung. He devoted himself, however, largely to writing plays.

Works
Of his dramas the following are considered of great merit:
 Die Gräfin, a tragedy (“The Countess,” 1868) This play was awarded a prize by the Berliner Schiller Commission.
 Brutus (1874–82)
 Das Mädchen von Byzanz (“The maid from Byzantium,” 1877-85)
 Der Verbannte (“The banished one,” 1879-81)
He also wrote sea stories and poems.

Notes

References
 

1815 births
1902 deaths
German editors
University of Bonn alumni
Humboldt University of Berlin alumni
German male dramatists and playwrights
19th-century German dramatists and playwrights
19th-century German male writers
19th-century German writers
People from Stralsund